Tawfik Sakr (born 8 November 1969) is an Egyptian former footballer. He competed in the men's tournament at the 1992 Summer Olympics.

References

External links
 
 
 

1969 births
Living people
Egyptian footballers
Egypt international footballers
Olympic footballers of Egypt
Footballers at the 1992 Summer Olympics
Place of birth missing (living people)
Association football defenders
Ghazl El Mahalla SC players
El Mansoura SC players